Alphonse Leboulanger (5 January 1906 – 3 August 1985) was a French racing cyclist. He rode in the 1936 Tour de France.

References

1906 births
1985 deaths
French male cyclists
Place of birth missing